Over Her Dead Body is a Nigerian comedy film about how mothers love their sons at the detriments of their daughter in-laws. The film was produced by the Pen Pusher production and distributed by a Nollywood distribution company known as Genesis. It was written, produced and directed by Sola Osofisan.
Over Her Dead Body is a Nigerian comedy film about how mothers love their sons at the detriments of their daughter in-laws. The film was produced by the Pen Pusher production and distributed by a Nollywood distribution company known as Genesis. It was written, produced and directed by Sola Osofisan.

It was released January 7, 2022.

Plot 
Zara's mother in-law after escaping death from highway thieves decided to stay with her son with the aim of taking care of her grandchildren. Upon arrival at their home, she discovered the couple doesn't have a child yet, hence she maltreat and pressures Zara to the extent that she had to fight back which turn the house to a war zone.

Cast 
 Nse Ikpe-Etim as Zara
 Binta Ayo Mogaji as Mama
 Adenike Ayodele as Simbi
 Patrick Dakota as Sunday
 Uche Mac-Auley as Nneoma
 Gregory Ojefua as Rasco
 Shola onomor as Muffy
 Ibim ice Spa as Sholay

References

External links 

2022 films
English-language Nigerian films